Intrinsic, or rho-independent termination, is a process in prokaryotes to signal the end of transcription and release the newly constructed RNA molecule. In prokaryotes such as E. coli, transcription is terminated either by a rho-dependent process or rho-independent process. In the Rho-dependent process, the rho-protein locates and binds the signal sequence in the mRNA and signals for cleavage. Contrarily, intrinsic termination does not require a special protein to signal for termination and is controlled by the specific sequences of RNA. When the termination process begins, the transcribed mRNA forms a stable secondary structure hairpin loop, also known as a Stem-loop. This RNA hairpin is followed by multiple uracil nucleotides. The bonds between uracil and adenine are very weak. A protein bound to RNA polymerase (nusA) binds to the stem-loop structure tightly enough to cause the polymerase to temporarily stall. This pausing of the polymerase coincides with transcription of the poly-uracil sequence. The weak adenine-uracil bonds lower the energy of destabilization for the RNA-DNA duplex, allowing it to unwind and dissociate from the RNA polymerase. Overall, the modified RNA structure is what terminates transcription. 

Stem-loop structures that are not followed by a poly-uracil sequence cause the RNA polymerase to pause, but it will typically continue transcription after a brief time because the duplex is too stable to unwind far enough to cause termination.

Rho-independent transcription termination is a frequent mechanism underlying the activity of cis-acting RNA regulatory elements, such as riboswitches.

Function 

The purpose function of intrinsic termination is to signal for the dissociation of the ternary elongation complex (TEC), signaling the end of a transcript in prokaryotes. Intrinsic termination independent of the protein Rho, as opposed to Rho-dependent termination, where the prokaryotic Rho protein comes in and acts on the RNA polymerase, causing it to dissociate. Here, there is no extra protein and the transcript forms its own loop structure. Intrinsic termination thus regulates the level of transcription as well, determining how many Polymerase can transcribe a gene over a given period of time, and can help prevent interactions with neighboring chromosomes.

Regulation of Intrinsic Termination 

The process itself is regulated through both positive and negative termination factors, usually through modification of the hairpin structure. This is accomplished through interactions with single stranded RNA that corresponds to the upstream area of the loop, resulting in disruption of the termination process. Furthermore, there is some implication that the nut site may also contribute to regulation, as it is involved in recruitment of some critical components in the formation of the hairpin.

Structure 
In intrinsic termination, the RNA transcript doubles back and base pairs with itself, creating an RNA stem-loop, or hairpin, structure. This structure is critical for the release of both the transcript and polymerase at the end of transcription. In living cells, the key components are the stable stem-loop itself, as well as the sequence of 6-8 uracil residues that follow it. The stem usually consists of 8-9 mostly guanine and cytosine (G-C) base pairs, and the loop consists of 4-8 residues. It is thought that the stem portion of the structure is essential for transcription termination, while the loop is not. This is suggested by the fact that termination can be achieved in non-native structures that do not include the loop.

The stem portion of the hairpin is usually rich in G-C base pairs. G-C base pairs have significant base-stacking interactions, and can form three hydrogen bonds with each other, which makes them very thermodynamically favorable. Conversely, while the uracil-rich sequence that follows the hairpin is not always necessary for termination, it is hypothesized that the uracil-rich sequence aids in intrinsic termination because the U-A bond is not as strong as G-C bonds. This inherent instability acts to kinetically favor the dissociation of the RNA transcript.

Experiments to determine structurally significant features

To determine the optimal length of the stem, researchers modified its length and observed how quickly termination occurred. When the length of the stem was lengthened or shortened from the standard 8-9 base pair length, termination was less efficient, and if the changes were great enough, termination ceased completely.

Experiments determined that if an oligonucleotide sequence that is identical to the downstream portion of the stem is present, it will base pair with the upstream portion. This creates a structure that is analogous to the native stem-loop structure but is missing the loop at the end. Without the presence of the loop, intrinsic termination is still able to occur. This indicates that the loop is not inherently necessary for intrinsic termination.

Generally, the absence of the uracil-rich sequence following the stem-loop will result in a delay or pause in transcription, but termination will not cease completely.

Mechanism 

Intrinsic termination is cued by signals directly encoded in the DNA and RNA. Signal appears in as a hairpin and is followed by 8 Uridines at the 3’ end. This leads to a rapid dissociation of the elongation complex . Hairpin inactivates and destabilizes the TEC by weakening interactions in the RNA-DNA binding site and other sites that hold this complex together. The pausing induced by the stretch of uracils is important and provides time for hairpin formation. In absence of U-tract, hair pin formation does not result in efficient termination, indicating its importance in this process.

The elongation destabilization process occurs in four steps

1) as RNA Polymerase transcribes the final nucleotides of the terminator U-tract, it pauses at end of U-tract, favoring the termination pathway in the kinetic competition between elongation and termination

2) Terminator hairpin (Thp) Nucleation

3) hairpin completion and elongation complex inactivation 

4) elongation complex dissociation A complete mechanism is likely to involve specific interactions of the polymerase, the RNA terminator hairpin, and dT-rich template sequences.

Inhibition of Intrinsic Termination 
In terms of inhibitors of intrinsic termination, much is still unknown. One of the few examples that is known is bacteriophage protein 7. This is made up of 3.4A and 4.0A cryo-EM structures of P7-NusA-TEC and P7-TEC. This bacteriophage protein 7 stops transcription termination by blocking the RNA polymerase (RNAP) RNA-exit channel and impeding RNA-hairpin formation at the intrinsic terminator. Furthermore, bacteriophage protein 7 inhibits RNAP-clamp motions. Shortening the C-terminal half-helix of the RNAP slightly decreases the inhibitory activity. These RNAP clamp motions have been targeted by some other inhibitors of bacterial RNAP. These inhibitors include myxopyronin, corallopyronin, and ripostatin. These work by inhibiting isomerization.

In Prokaryotes: Archaea vs Eubacteria 
Archaeal transcription shares eukaryotic and prokaryotic ties. With eukaryotes, it shares similarities with its initiation factors that help transcription identify appropriate sequences such as TATA box homologs as well as factors that maintain transcription elongation. However, additional transcription factors similar to those found in prokaryotes are needed for the whole process to occur. 

In terms of transcription termination, the archaeal genome is unique in that it is sensitive to both intrinsic termination and factor-dependent termination. Bioinformatic analysis has shown that approximately half of the genes and operons in Archaea arrange themselves into signals or contain signals for intrinsic termination. Archaeal RNA polymerase is responsive to intrinsic signals both in vivo and in vitro such as the poly-U-Rich regions. However, unlike typical prokaryotic intrinsic termination, no specific RNA structure or hairpin is needed. The surrounding environment and other genome factors can still influence the termination. 

Experimental studies have been conducted on Thermococcus Kodakarensis, an archaea found in the thermal springs and gas vents of Japan. For this species, a universal euryarchaeal termination factor called Eta was discovered. It is important to note that this factor is not a homolog of the bacterial termination factor Rho. When Eta acts on a specific transcript, it interacts with RNA polymerase as well as upstream DNA sequences on the template strand. For intrinsic termination in T. Kodakarensis, studies have shown other intrinsic structural features besides hairpin loops can lead to termination. These features  include the upstream presence of an oligo-T nucleotide sequence (approximately 7-8 T nucleotides is sufficient) as well as specific intergenic terminator sequences with one to three upstream oligo T-tracts. During these studies, the presence of these structural features led to over 90% reduced expression of the reporter gene. The intergenic sequences were identified using the GeSTer Algorithm, which predicts and arranges the efficiency of intrinsic terminators. Further experiments showed that intergenic sequences carrying small induced mutations showed similar reduced expression to the wildtype intergenic sequences. This finding demonstrated that the reduced expression due to termination was not just due to the oligo T-tract or possible formation of a hairpin.

See also
Rho factor
WebGeSTer
Trp operon

References 

Gene expression
Molecular biology
Prokaryotes